The superintendent of the United States Air Force Academy is the senior officer and commander of the United States Air Force Academy in Colorado Springs, Colorado.  The position is normally held by an active duty Air Force lieutenant general, and is roughly equivalent to the president of a university. Because the Academy is a Direct Reporting Unit, the superintendent reports directly to the Air Force Chief of Staff. The superintendent oversees all aspects of the Academy, including military training, academics, athletics, admissions and the base infrastructure.

The position of superintendent is established by statute, under 10 U.S.C. § 9333 and 10 U.S.C. § 9333a. Under those sections of law, the superintendent is appointed by the president of the United States, must serve as superintendent at least three years, and must retire at the end of his tour as superintendent, unless the retirement is waived by the Secretary of Defense under 10 U.S.C. § 8921. The practice of mandatory retirement has changed over time, however, as many early superintendents went on to higher positions in the Air Force after their terms at the Academy.

Although it is not an official requirement for the position, nearly all superintendents have received their commissions from the academy (or from the USMA, if they graduated prior to the establishment of the USAFA).

List of Superintendents of the United States Air Force Academy

List of Vice Superintendent of the United States Air Force Academy
 Col Douglas K. Lamberth, July 2014 – December 2016
 Col David A. Harris Jr., July 2016
 Col Houston R. Cantwell, July 2018
 Col Otis C. Jones, July 2020
 Col Benjamin R. Jonsson, August 2022

Notes

See also
Superintendent of the United States Military Academy
List of Superintendents of the United States Naval Academy

References

 
Superintendents